One Missed Call is a 2008 supernatural horror film directed by Eric Valette and written by Andrew Klavan. An international co-production between the United States, the United Kingdom, Japan and Germany, it is a remake of the 2003 Japanese film of the same name directed by Takashi Miike, which itself was based on the Yasushi Akimoto novel Chakushin Ari. The film stars Shannyn Sossamon, Edward Burns, Ana Claudia Talancón, Ray Wise and Azura Skye.

The film was released in North America on January 4, 2008. Despite being a moderate box office success, the film was panned by film critics, with many regarding it as the worst J-horror remake to be released. It became the worst-reviewed film of 2008, receiving a 0% rating approval on Rotten Tomatoes, and winning a Mouldy Tomato Award.

Plot
A paramedic rescues a young girl from the blazing Saint Luke's hospital before unsuccessfully inquiring about her mother's whereabouts. Sometime afterwards, undergraduate Shelley Baum hears her cat meowing near her koi pond. After she heads over to investigate, a hand appears and drowns her and her cat. Days later, college students Beth Raymond and Leann Cole discuss Shelley's funeral. Leann's cellphone rings in a lullaby-esque ringtone, with a call from Shelley. She opens it to an eerie voicemail of herself, dated for June 12 at 10:17 PM.  Subsequently suffering from disturbing hallucinations, she calls Beth while returning from a study session. Beth rushes to her location but arrives just as Leann falls off an overpass and is struck by a train. A red candy pops out of her mouth, and her severed hand dials a number on her phone. At Leann's funeral, her ex-boyfriend Brian Sousa departs after experiencing hallucinations. Outside a coffee shop, he shows Beth Leann's post-mortem voicemail, dated minutes away. An acetylene tank explosion from the adjacent construction site launches debris into the air, and a rebar impales Brian's torso. A red candy is ejected from his mouth, and he collapses.

The next day, Beth meets police detective Jack Andrews, who mentions that his sister Jean interned with Shelley at Saint Luke's and died two days prior. They determine the events are interrelated, and he provides his contact card. Beth consoles her friend Taylor Anthony, who is distraught by a premonitory feeling of being the next victim, by removing the batteries from their cellphones to disable them. That night, Taylor's cellphone rings, which she opens to a video of her apparent demise. The following morning, Jack and Beth research geriatric nurse Marie Layton, originator of the calls, and find the autopsy report of her eldest daughter Ellie, who died from an acute asthmatic episode. The file, mentioning "no bruising but evidence of past scars" with an attached CPS file for further consultation, indicates that Jean, a psychiatric nurse, questioned Marie at Saint Luke's and noted nine admissions between April and May for Ellie and her sister Laurel, concerning several causes, leading Beth to assume that Marie had FDIA.

Meanwhile, TV producer Ted Summers, who approached Taylor earlier, prepares to record her exorcism, explaining that spiritual energy operates in the same electromagnetic spectrum as light/microwaves and is therefore transmissible via cellular phones from which it manifests as hallucinations. Noticing the show's advertisement on TV, Beth races to the site, arriving to an unseen force fatally choking Taylor. Her phone then sounds with a voicemail dated for tomorrow. Assuming that finding Marie will settle the matter, she ventures to Saint Luke's and encounters Jack. As they enter an operating room, Marie's spirit ejects and incapacitates Jack. Locked inside, Beth throws a chiming phone across the room, where it knocks the air duct's grill cover loose, revealing a crawlspace. Inside, she discovers Marie's charred corpse clutching a cellphone, which awakens. After pursuing and intercepting Beth, Marie weeps and murmurs, "Forgive me." Subsequently, Beth tells Jack that Marie might have brought her there to protect her.

At Laurel's foster home, Jack uncovers a compact disc from the nanny cam embedded in the eye of Laurel's teddy bear. The footage reveals Ellie incising Laurel with a knife in their bedroom. Marie entered shortly thereafter, discovered Ellie's abusiveness, and rushed Laurel to the hospital. Ellie, locked inside, began pressing wheezingly on the inhaler but was overwhelmed and collapsed, facing the future curse's constituents (millipedes, an uncanny doll of a mother with baby in a perambulator (hallucinations), and the lullaby-esque music emanating from the teddy, audible during every victim's call), before dying from asphyxia while dialing her mother's phone number. Laurel imparts that though Ellie injured her, she always provided candies. Realizing Ellie caused the curse, he drives to Beth's house, during which a colleague informs him of a new voicemail. After he enters, somebody knocks on the door. As he peers through the peephole, a knife stabs through it, killing him. Ellie appears and attacks Beth, but Marie's spirit intervenes, bounds Ellie in Jack's phone, and reconciles with Beth before evanescing. Jack's mouth spills a red candy and his cellphone auto-dials.

Cast

Production
One Missed Call was announced in 2005, before being officially greenlit by Warner Bros. in early 2006, with Eric Valette signing as the film's director. The film began production in June in Atlanta, Georgia with Edward Burns, Margaret Cho, and Shannyn Sossamon signing on. On August 3, Ed Harris and Gabriel Byrne both signed on to appear in the film but both withdrew due to unknown circumstances.

Sound designers used the voice of Skid Row front man Sebastian Bach in the hospital basement scene. The exact clip comes from Bach's scream at the beginning of "Midnight Tornado", a song from the band's 1989 debut album, Skid Row.

Release

Marketing
In December 2007, the official website was launched as well as numerous websites running competitions to promote the film with the first prize being an Apple iPhone.

Theatrical
The film was intended for release on August 24, 2007, but was delayed until January 4, 2008. The song "Life is Beautiful" by Sixx:A.M. was used in television advertisements for the film.

Home media
The DVD, HD DVD, and Blu-ray were released on April 22, 2008, none of which contain any special features. The film was also released on iTunes and on the Xbox Live Marketplace.

Reception

Critical reception
The film was not screened for critics. , the film holds a 0% approval rating on Rotten Tomatoes, based on 81 reviews with an average rating of 2.60/10, also earning the site's Mouldy Tomato Award for the worst-reviewed film of 2008. The site's consensus states: "One of the weakest entries in the J-horror remake sweepstakes, One Missed Call is undone by bland performances and shopworn shocks". It is rated the second worst film of the 2000s decade behind Ballistic: Ecks vs. Sever. Metacritic reported that the film had an aggregate score of 24 out of 100, based on 14 reviews, indicating "generally unfavorable reviews". CinemaScore gave the film a "D".

Despite being a remake of Chakushin ari, the film was strongly criticized for borrowing plot elements from and being similar to Scream (1996), Final Destination (2000), The Ring (2002), The Grudge (2004), Dark Water (2005), and Pulse (2006).

Relationship with One Missed Call (2003)
One Missed Call includes most of the scenes and characters that were in the original 2003 film. These include the exorcism scene, where one of the characters is killed while filming the show American Miracles. The characters of Beth, Leann, Taylor, Jack, Brian, and Shelley are respectively based on the original characters Yumi, Yoko, Natsumi, Yamashita, Kenji, and Rina. Another reference is contained within the theatrical trailer; while Leann is walking down the street, a piece of the original ringtone from One Missed Call (2003) plays in the background until she falls from the overpass.

References

External links
 
 
 
 
 
 

2008 films
2000s ghost films
2008 horror films
Japanese horror films
American supernatural horror films
German horror films
English-language German films
English-language Japanese films
Horror film remakes
Alcon Entertainment films
Warner Bros. films
Films about child abuse
American remakes of Japanese films
Asian-American horror films
One Missed Call
Films based on adaptations
Films scored by Reinhold Heil
Films based on Japanese novels
Films produced by Scott Kroopf
Techno-horror films
2000s English-language films
2000s American films
2000s Japanese films
2000s German films